The Infiltrator is a 1995 American thriller drama film directed by John Mackenzie based on the book In Hitler's Shadow: An Israeli's Journey Inside Germany's Neo-Nazi Movement by Yaron Svoray and Nick Taylor about an Israeli freelance journalist who travels to Germany in the early 1990s and uncovers a dangerously pervasive underground Neo-Nazi faction with the intent to bring Nazism back to the forefront in Germany. It stars Oliver Platt, Arliss Howard, Tony Haygarth, Julian Glover and Michael Byrne.

The film was released on June 24, 1995 on HBO. It was final film under HBO Showcase banner before it was renamed to HBO NYC Productions in 1996.

Cast
 Oliver Platt as Yaron Svoray
 Arliss Howard as Ricky Eaton
 Tony Haygarth as Gunther Fischer
 Michael Byrne as Dieter Creutz
 Julian Glover as Bielert
 Alex Kingston as Anna

Original airing
The film originally aired on HBO on June 24, 1995.

Reception
Variety praised the high quality of performances and production values of the film and called it "powerful TV, all the more unsettling for reminding us that right-wing extremism didn’t die with Hitler."

References

External links
 
 

1995 films
1990s thriller drama films
American thriller drama films
Films directed by John Mackenzie (film director)
Films about journalists
Films about racism
Films set in Germany
Neo-Nazism in Germany
1995 drama films
1990s English-language films
1990s American films